Sierra Leone competed at the 2010 Summer Youth Olympics, the inaugural Youth Olympic Games, held in Singapore from 14 August to 26 August 2010. The nation was represented by the National Olympic Committee of Sierra Leone, which sent a total of three athletes to compete in one sport, athletics. The flagbearer at the opening ceremony for the nation was athlete Nenneh Barrie. Sierra Leone's Olympic team was one of the 106 that did not win a single medal at the Games.

Athletics

Athletics was the only sport Sierra Leone participated in. All three athletes did not make it to the medal final, but instead entered the C Finals (non-medal final) to compete with other athletes who similarly did not make the mark.

Boys
Track and Road Events

Girls
Track and Road Events

See also 
 Sierra Leone at the Olympics
 Sport in Sierra Leone

References

External links 
 Competitors List: Sierra Leone – Singapore 2010 official site
 Schedule/Results – Singapore 2010 official site

2010 in Sierra Leonean sport
Nations at the 2010 Summer Youth Olympics
Sierra Leone at the Youth Olympics